Helmut Robert Duckadam (born 1 April 1959) is a Romanian retired footballer who played as a goalkeeper.

He was dubbed "the Hero of Seville" due to his performance in the 1986 European Cup Final, won by his club Steaua București, where he saved all four penalties against Barcelona in the penalty shootout, for the first time in football history. He represented three other teams in a 14-year senior career.

Duckadam regularly appears as a studio guest on Digi Sport's "Fotbal Club" programme.

Career 

Born in Semlac, Arad County of Banat Swabian (German) descent, Duckadam started playing in his regional leagues, before moving to FC UTA Arad in 1978 to become professional. He earned two full caps for Romania in 1982 and, subsequently, was signed by country giants Steaua București.

Duckadam, who was instrumental in helping the capital side to two consecutive Liga I titles, was also between the posts for the 1986 European Cup Final against FC Barcelona, which was played in Seville, on 7 May 1986. He saved four consecutive penalty shots in the shootout, from José Ramón Alexanko, Ángel Pedraza, Pichi Alonso and Marcos, being the first one to do so in an official European competition. Steaua won the shootout 2–0 and Europe's most important club trophy for the first time, and much of the credit for the surprise victory was given to him; he scored one goal for his main club, through a penalty kick against AFC Progresul București in the domestic cup. Duckadam was nominated for the Ballon d'Or in 1986.

In 1986, Duckadam suffered a rare blood disorder only few weeks after the Seville performance, and would only resume his career three years later, finishing it with lowly Vagonul Arad in the second division. According to a personal interview given in 1999, he had become a major with the Romanian Border Police (Poliția de Frontieră) in his hometown; additionally, he opened a football school in the city, named after himself.

On 25 March 2008, Duckadam was decorated by the President of Romania, Traian Băsescu, with Ordinul "Meritul Sportiv" – ("The Sportive Merit" Order – class II), for his part in winning the 1986 European Cup. Two years later, on 11 August, he was named honorary president at FCSB. He left the club in 2020.

Honours
Steaua București
Divizia A: 1984–85, 1985–86
Cupa României: 1984–85
European Cup: 1985–86

Individual
Romanian Footballer of the Year: 1986
Ballon d'Or: 1986 (8th place)

References

External links
 
 
 

1959 births
Living people
People from Arad County
Romanian people of German descent
Romanian footballers
Association football goalkeepers
Romania international footballers
Romania under-21 international footballers
Liga I players
Liga II players
FC UTA Arad players
FC Steaua București players
Vagonul Arad players
FC Steaua București presidents